Teri is Former Tehsil of Kohat now a village and Union Council in Karak District of Khyber Pakhtunkhwa, Pakistan. It is located at 33°18'0"N 71°6'0"E with an altitude of 634 metres (2,083 feet).

Teri, the Khattak town of Kohat Division, Banda Daudshah Tehsil. Teri is 38 miles from Kohat. Situated four miles west of Kohat-Bannu road, Teri is the oldest Khattak town. It is one of the important Khattak towns along with Lachi and Gumbat and Akora Khattak. Teri is situated beside the Toi (river of that name. There is open well-cultivated valley between Teri and the hills to the north. The town is close to the Toi and is well situated on a rising ground overlooking the surrounding country. Teri is a large valley situated between Mirandaey (Mirandi) and Thuwaanraey (Sawani) Ghaar mountain range. These are the two highest mountain ranges of Khattak-nama. The different spellings of Teri in the old books of English surveyors are as follows starting from the oldest one: 1. Teri 2. Terri 3. Tiraey 4. Teeree

There is one old temple of Advaitanand Ji in Teri, which was renovated 2021.
 
Until 1940, Teri was a princely state, at astatus of Tehsil  ruled by Nawab of Teri as a Tehsildar. Teri State had an area of 1616 square miles comprising

a) present Karak District: Banda Daudshah Tehsil, Karak Tehsil, Takht-e-Nasrati Tehsil and b) half of present Kohat District: LachiTehsil and Gumbat area.

Teri State was divided into following Tappas (satrapies): 1. Teri, 2. Senaey Khwarram (part of present Banda Daudshah Tehsil, part of Lachi Tehsil and Gumbat area) 3. Barak (present Takht-e-Nasrati Tehsil and Karak Tehsil)

Teri State's Barak area was topographical ly divided into two parts : 1. Tsavatra- Chauntra or the elevated territory (most of Banda Daudshah Tehsil and most of Karak Tehsil) 2. Taal or the sandy plains (Takht-e-Nasrati Tehsil and part of Karak Tehsil, Latambararea) Tsavatra is from the Hindi word Chauntra. Chauntra means elevated land. This is a common terminology in Punjab. Taal is again from the Hindi word Thall-Tal, meaning sand. Thall Desert of Sindh Sagar Doab is an example. Another example is of the famous Thar Desert of Sindh, Pakistan. Here the last consonant 'l' changes to 'r'

History of Khattak's and establishment of Teri Town
The first mentioning of the Khattak tribe in history is that they migrated from Shawal Mountain Range (now inhabited by Waziris). Their chief, Malik Akor Khan first established himself at Karbogha, a village of Tall Tehsil, Hangu District, north-west of Teri. Malik Akor Khan then moved in a north-east direction and settled at the bank of Kabul River, Landaey Daryab (short river). The town of Akora Khattak was founded by Malik Akor Khan. It was the first capital of Khattak's. Mughal Emperor, Akbar while on a visit to Peshawar made Malik Akor Khan a government servant and charged him with the responsibility of collecting tolls from the caravans on the crossing of the Indus at Attock. Malik Akor Khan was the grandfather of the famous warrior-poet, Khushal Khan Khattak.

Malik Akor Khan Originator of Akor Khel dynasty Ruled from 1550 Died in 1600

The chief of Khattaks used to sit at Akora and his deputy used to be at Teri. In 1759, Teri got independent of Akora and started to have its own independent chief. Teri 1550-1956 400 Years of Chiefship.

Chiefs of Khattaks 1550 to 1956
 Malik Akor Khan. The originator of the Akor Khel Dynasty. Ruled from 1550. Died in 1600.
 Yahya Khan. Ruled from 1600. Died in 1620
 Shahbaz Khan I. Ruled from 1620. Died in 1641.
 Khushal Khan I. Poet. National Poet of Afghanistan. Ruled from 1641. Born in 1613. Died, 25 February 1689.
 Ashraf Khan. Poet. Ruled from 1659. Died in 1682.
 Muhammad Afzal Khan. The Historian, author of Tarikh-i-Murassa (History of India, Pashtuns, Khattaks) Poet Ruled from 1682. Died in 1741.
 Sadullah Khan. alias Khan Shaheed. Last Akor Khel Chief to rule both Akora and Teri. Teri was named Asad-abad because of this Chief. Ruled from 1741 Died in 1748.(established town of Teri at present site ).
 Shahbaz Khan. An ancestor of the Teri Chiefs. Ruled from 1759. Died in 1799.(shahbaz Garhi near Spina named after him )
 Mansur Khan. Ruled from 1799. Died in 1800.(mansurgarh named after him.)
 Nasir Khan. Ruled from 1800. Died in 1812.(Nasir kot /Nasir Banda in esa khel named after him )
 Arsalla Khan. Ruled from 1812. Died in 1818.
 Khushal Khan II. Ruled from 1818. Died in 1827.
 Biland Khan. Ruled from 1827. Died in 1837.(Biland Kala sabirabad side named after him )
 Rasul Khan. Ruled from 1837. Died in 1844.
 Nawab Khan Bahadur (KB) Sir Khwaja Muhammad Khan Knight Commander of the Order of the Star of India (K.C.S.I.). Nawab, 1873; KB conferred in 1873.(khwja Mohammed in Hangu named after him ) Born in 1824. Ruled from 1844. Died in 1889.
 Khan Bahadur (KB) Muhammad Zafar Khan aka Darmalak Khan. Died in 1895.
 Nawab Khan Bahadur (KB) Abdul Ghafoor Khan Also known as Sakhee (generous) Nawab Sahib. Born in 1853. Died in 1913.
 Nawab Muhammad Abdul Rahman Khan. Born in 1888. Died in 1918.
 Nawab Khan Bahadur (KB) Hon. Major and Magistrate Baz Muhammad Khan "Chief of Khattaks" Born in 1896/1899. Died, 12 April 1979. ruled Upton 1940 He was the last Nawab of the Teri State.Jagirdari/Nawabi system was abolished in 1956 by the Government of Pakistan. In his family, there remain not a single prominent figure, except his grandson Nawabzada Muhammad Farooq who has struggled little bit for the development of this area. Nawabzada Farooq Khan known as Bakht Sultan Khan s/o Nawabzada Zafar Ali Khan. Born on 6 March 1948. Elected Member District Council in 1983. Member * Majlis-e-Shoora (Member Provincial Council) in 1984. Advisor to Governor NWFP in 1984. Served village Teri in his maximum-capacity as under:

To develop Teri and to bring it in the sight of the provincial and federal governments, he invited Lt. Gen. Fazl-e-Haq the governor of NWFP, for a partridge shoot at Teri to gain his approval for the metaled road from Banda Daud Shah to Gurguri, telephone exchange with multiple domestic connections, district hospital in Banda Daud Shah, inter-college in Banda Daud Shah, provision of clean drinking water tube wells, electrification at a mass scale to several villages around Teri in tehsil Banda Daud Shah such as Gurguri, Shagai, and Barbara villages, drainage system inside Teri and also the approval of mega-budget for the feasibility survey of Sharki Dam. He achieved all the above goals with their completion during his tenure as Member Provincial Council Col (R) Nawabzada Barkat Khattak, another son of the family made his contribution while in service to improve electricity issues through WAPDA.

References

Populated places in Karak District
Karak District